Dacne is a genus of pleasing fungus beetles in the family Erotylidae. There are about 19 described species in Dacne.

Species
These 19 species belong to the genus Dacne:

 Dacne bipustulata (Thunberg, 1781)
 Dacne californica (Horn, 1870)
 Dacne cephalotes Casey
 Dacne cyclochilus Boyle, 1954
 Dacne elongata Casey
 Dacne hujiayaoi Dai & Zhao, 2013
 Dacne laticollis Casey
 Dacne notata (Gmelin, 1790)
 Dacne picea LeConte, 1875
 Dacne picta Crotch, 1873
 Dacne pontica (Bedel, 1868)
 Dacne pubescens Boyle, 1956
 Dacne quadrimaculata (Say, 1835)
 Dacne rufifrons (Fabricius, 1775)
 Dacne semirufula (Reitter, 1897)
 Dacne tangliangi Dai & Zhao, 2013
 Dacne uteana Casey
 Dacne vittata Casey
 † Dacne brodzinskyi Skelley, 1997

References

Further reading

External links

 

Erotylidae
Articles created by Qbugbot
Cucujoidea genera